My Family's Beautiful! (Spanish:¡Qué linda es mi familia!) is a 1980 Argentine comedy film directed by Palito Ortega and starring Luis Sandrini and Niní Marshall. It was the final film of the comedian Marshall, who had made her screen debut in 1938.

Cast
 Luis Sandrini 
 Niní Marshall as Rosita  
 Palito Ortega 
 Las Trillizas de Oro 
 Mariana Karr 
 Silvia Merlino
 Rolo Puente 
 Héctor Armendáriz 
 Angélica Perrone 
 Rubén Green 
 Vicente La Russa 
 Alberto Irizar
 Rodolfo Onetto 
 Sergio Malbrán 
 Luis Corradi 
 Ricardo Jordán 
 Thelma Stefani 
 Luis Tasca 
 Diego Armando Maradona 
 Juan Alberto Mateyko 
 Alberto Martín 
 Pablo Olivo 
 Jorge Marchegiani 
 Alfredo Monserrat
 Juan Carlos Altavista 
 Carlos Balá 
 Raúl Florido

References

Bibliography 
 Federico Finchelstein. The Ideological Origins of the Dirty War: Fascism, Populism, and Dictatorship in Twentieth Century Argentina. Oxford University Press, 2014.

External links 
 

1980 films
Argentine comedy films
1980 comedy films
1980s Spanish-language films
1980s Argentine films